Luke Fletcher (born 1995/1996) is a Welsh politician who has been a Member of the Senedd (MS) for the South Wales West region since 2021. He is a member of Plaid Cymru.

He was born in Pencoed and earned a degree and master's degree from Cardiff University. He worked in a bar for five years before he started working as an economy and finance researcher.

He stood as Plaid Cymru's parliamentary candidate in Ogmore in the 2019 general election and finished fourth.

Early life
Fletcher was born and raised in Pencoed and attended Ysgol Gymraeg Bro Ogwr primary school and Ysgol Gyfun Llanhari. Fletcher then moved to Cardiff to study Politics and International relations at Cardiff University and completed a Master's degree in Welsh Government and Politics.

Political career
Fletcher stood as Plaid Cymru's parliamentary candidate in Ogmore in the 2019 general election and finished fourth.

He contested the Ogmore constituency at the 2021 Senedd election, finishing 2nd. Fletcher was then elected as a Member of the Senedd for the region of South Wales West.

References

Year of birth missing (living people)
Living people
Plaid Cymru members of the Senedd
Alumni of Cardiff University
Wales MSs 2021–2026
Welsh-speaking politicians